San Giorio di Susa is a comune (municipality) in the Metropolitan City of Turin in the Italian region Piedmont, located about 45 km west of Turin.

San Giorio di Susa borders the following municipalities: Bruzolo, Chianocco, Bussoleno, San Didero, Villar Focchiardo, Coazze, Roure.

The castle of San Giorio di Susa was visited by King Edward I of England in 1273 on his way back from crusade. The distinctive three pinnacled merlons of the crenellations were later copied at Conwy Castle in Wales.

References

Cities and towns in Piedmont